Pillow of Death is a 1945 film noir mystery horror film directed by Wallace Fox and starring Lon Chaney, Jr. and Brenda Joyce. The last of the Inner Sanctum mystery films, it is based on a story by Dwight V. Babcock.  The "Inner Sanctum" franchise originated with a popular radio series and all of the films star Lon Chaney, Jr. It was the only entry in the series to dispense with the introduction by a disembodied head in a crystal ball, as well as the only one to feature comic-relief characters to alleviate the grim tone.

Plot summary
Attorney Wayne Fletcher (Chaney, Jr.) intends to divorce his wife and marry his secretary (Joyce), who comes from a wealthy family. When the wife is found suffocated to death, he naturally becomes the suspect. As others are killed in the same manner and a phony medium (Bromberg) also claims Fletcher is guilty, Fletcher begins to imagine his dead wife is communicating with him, making it even more difficult for him to prove his innocence.

Cast
Lon Chaney, Jr. as Wayne Fletcher (billed as Lon Chaney)
Brenda Joyce as Donna Kincaid
J. Edward Bromberg as Julian Julian
Rosalind Ivan as Amelia Kincaid
Clara Blandick as Belle Kincaid
George Cleveland as Sam Kincaid
Wilton Graff as Cap'n McCracken
Bernard Thomas as Bruce Malone (billed as Bernard B. Thomas)

References

External links

 
 
Review of film at Variety

1945 films
1945 crime films
1945 mystery films
American black-and-white films
Films based on radio series
Films directed by Wallace Fox
Universal Pictures films
1945 horror films
American crime films
Film noir
1940s American films